This article details the Catalans Dragons rugby league football club's 2015 season. This is the Dragons 10th season in the Super League after they entered through the franchise system, becoming the first successful team.

Pre season friendlies

Catalan score is first.

Table

2015 fixtures and results

2015 Super League Fixtures

2015 Super 8's

Player appearances
Super League Only

 = Injured

 = Suspended

Challenge Cup

Player appearances
Challenge Cup Games only

2015 squad statistics

 Appearances and points include (Super League, Challenge Cup and Play-offs) as of 27 September 2015.

 = Injured
 = Suspended

2015 transfers in/out

In

Out

References

External links
Catalans Dragons Website
Catalans Dragons - SL Website

Catalans Dragons seasons
Super League XX by club
2015 in French rugby league